Podbořanský Rohozec (until 1949 Německý Rohozec;  or Teutschenrust)  is a municipality and village in Louny District in the Ústí nad Labem Region of the Czech Republic. It has about 200 inhabitants.

Administrative parts
The hamlet of Bukovina is an administrative part of Podbořanský Rohozec.

Notable people
Eduard Glaser (1855–1908), Austrian archaeologist and explorer

References

External links

Villages in Louny District